is a former Japanese football player.

Club statistics

References

External links

1981 births
Living people
Chuo University alumni
Association football people from Kanagawa Prefecture
Japanese footballers
J1 League players
J2 League players
J3 League players
Shonan Bellmare players
Júbilo Iwata players
Fukushima United FC players
Association football goalkeepers